Eisenhower Park, formerly known as Salisbury Park, is a public park in East Meadow, New York bordered by Hempstead Turnpike on the south and Old Country Road on the north. At , it is larger than Central Park (in Manhattan, New York City), with much of the area devoted to three 18-hole golf courses, including the Red Course, host to the annual Commerce Bank Championship (Champions Tour). The park is home to the September 11th Memorial for residents of Nassau County.

History

Part of the county park system since 1944, Eisenhower Park offers a full range of athletic and family activities, including some of the finest facilities in Nassau County and an exciting schedule of summertime events.

In the early part of the 20th century, the park was part of the private Salisbury Country Club and included five 18-hole golf courses. It hosted the ninth PGA Championship in 1926, then a match play competition. Walter Hagen defeated future two-time champion Leo Diegel 5 & 3 in the finals to win his third consecutive title, his fourth overall, and the eighth of his eleven major titles. The championship was conducted on the present-day Red Course.

During the Great Depression, the club's owners were unable to pay taxes and the county took over the property. Subsequently, the county acquired additional land in the area. In 1944, Nassau County Park at Salisbury was established as part of County Executive J. Russell Sprague's vision to create a park that "one day will be to Nassau County what Central Park is today to New York City."  Salisbury Park was officially dedicated in October 1949.

On October 13, 1969, Salisbury Park was rededicated as Dwight D. Eisenhower Memorial Park at a ceremony attended by the 34th President's grandson, Dwight D. Eisenhower II, and his wife, Julie Nixon Eisenhower. The elder Eisenhower had died several months earlier in March and would have turned age 79 on October 14.

On March 11, 2004, President George W. Bush visited Eisenhower Park for the groundbreaking of a new memorial for the victims of the September 11, 2001 attacks.

On September 9, 2007, the memorial was officially opened to the public. The two , semi-transparent, stainless-steel towers, created to resemble those of the World Trade Center, stand amidst a fountain alongside the park's lake. On the lawn are two pieces of steel several feet long from the WTC wreckage, surrounded by a colorful flower garden. A long stone wall bears the names of the 344 Nassau County residents who died September 11, 2001.

Nearby, a plaque honoring those who were killed in New York City, at the Pentagon, and in Pennsylvania begins Our Story and reads that the events that transpired that day ultimately changed the lives of all Americans.

The memorial, which culminated five years of planning, was designed by the architects Keith Striga of Valley Stream and Philip Gavosto of Glen Cove. To help build it, more than 500 union members from Long Island trades volunteered time and materials.

Activities in the park

Athletics

Batting cage, with nine separate batting areas for varying pitching speeds
14 softball fields
3 baseball fields
3 football fields
4 soccer fields
16 lighted tennis courts
A  Aquatic Center swimming pool

Entertainment
The Harry Chapin Lakeside Theatre is an outdoor theater that hosts a full schedule of entertainment events during the summer, from concerts to movies. The theater's name serves as a tribute to the late folk rock singer. Chapin was killed in a traffic collision en route to a free benefit concert in the park on July 16, 1981. That same year, a ceremony was held to around 5,500 people to commemorate the renaming of the theater. 

Carltun on the Park is a privately run restaurant operated in a former country club. The Carltun offers a restaurant, bar, banquet facilities, and a meeting room. The restaurant has played host to numerous events, including a fundraiser in 2004 for George W. Bush.

Golf
The park features three 18-hole golf courses open to the public: the Blue, Red, and White courses. The Red Course, originally part of the Salisbury Golf Club and designed in 1914 by Devereux Emmet, formerly hosted the annual Commerce Bank Championship on the Champions Tour, last held in 2008. It was also the site of the PGA Championship in 1926, won by Walter Hagen.

Located adjacent to the courses is a driving range with more than 100 stalls and night hours in season.

In addition to the regular courses, there are two lighted 18-hole miniature golf courses.

Swimming

The Nassau County Aquatic Center at  Eisenhower Park is one of the finest swimming facilities in the U.S. Built in 1998 for the Goodwill Games, it currently hosts major swimming competitions and is open daily to the public.

Located within the center is a renovated Health Club that contains treadmills, arc trainers, stationary bikes, stair machines, free weights, and an assortment of Cybex weight machines.

Hockey
Northwell Health Ice Center is the practice facility for the New York Islanders and has been since 2015 it was formerly known as twin rinks since being built in 2014.

References

External links

 Nassau County 9/11 memorial Images From the Project Architects
 Nassaucountyny.gov/EisenhowerPark 
Nassau County 9/11 Memorial Photo- Located at Eisenhower Park
Eisenhower Park Golf Course - LongIslandGolfNews.com

Hempstead, New York
Swimming venues in New York (state)
Golf clubs and courses in New York (state)
Golf clubs and courses designed by Devereux Emmet
Parks in Nassau County, New York
Urban public parks